Michele Fedrizzi (born ) is an Italian male volleyball player. With his club Trentino Diatec he competed at the 2013 FIVB Volleyball Men's Club World Championship.

References

External links
 profile at FIVB.org

1991 births
Living people
Italian men's volleyball players
Place of birth missing (living people)
21st-century Italian people